Zhang Shi (1133–1181), also known by numerous courtesy names and various romanizations, was a scholar during the Song Dynasty in China and key figure in Neo-Confucianism.

He was a native of Mianzhu, Sichuan, and the son of a distinguished general and statesman named Zhang Jun (1097–1164), who held the tile of Duke of Yi.

After studying under Hu Hong, son of Hu Anguo, Zhang Shi commenced an official career and became aide-de-camp and secretary to his father. In 1164 his father died, and Zhang Shi buried him according to his wish at the foot of Mount Heng in Hunan, remaining in seclusion near the grave for several years. While there he was visited in 1167 by Zhu Xi, and it is said that they spent three days and three nights arguing about the Doctrine of the Mean. The result was that Zhang returned to official life, and became a strong opponent of the Jurchen Jin and of the policy of conciliation and concession which had been introduced by Qin Gui. He was alternately promoted and demoted until he died while governor of Zhingzhou in Hubei. He was the author of many treatises and commentaries covering portions of the Confucian Canon, in which he gave expression to doctrines which his friend, Zhu Xi, felt himself called upon to refute. Nevertheless, Zhu Xi held Zhang Shi in high esteem and always spoke of him with admiration. Admitted to the honors at China's Confucian temples in 1261, he was granted the posthumous name Wenxuangong.

References
 

1133 births
1181 deaths
Chinese Confucianists